Brian John Allsop (1935–1989) was an Australian professional rugby league footballer who played in the 1950s and 1960s who played in the New South Wales Rugby League. A , Allsop played for two Sydney clubs during his career, 80 matches for the Eastern Suburbs club in the years (1955–1959), and 74 for Manly-Warringah (1960–1964).

An Eastern Suburbs junior, Allsop made it into the first grade side in 1955, in that season he was the NSWRFL leading try scorer with 18 tries scored in his 17 matches that year. In one match that year against the Parramatta Eels he scored 5 tries. Allsop was a representative of Sydney and NSW. The speedy winger scored a total of 59 tries for Easts before departing for Manly where he scored a further 36 in his time there. He retired at the end of the 1964 season.

References

 The Encyclopedia of Rugby League players (Alan Whiticker & Glen Hudson)

1935 births
1989 deaths
Australian rugby league players
Manly Warringah Sea Eagles players
Sydney Roosters players
City New South Wales rugby league team players
New South Wales rugby league team players
Rugby league players from Sydney
Rugby league wingers